A Week's Vacation is a 1980 French drama film directed by Bertrand Tavernier. It was entered into the 1980 Cannes Film Festival.

Cast
 Nathalie Baye - Laurence Cuers
 Gérard Lanvin - Pierre
 Flore Fitzgerald - Anne
 Michel Galabru - Mancheron
 Jean Dasté - Le père de Laurence
 Marie-Louise Ebeli - La mère de Laurence
 Philippe Delaigue - Jacques, le frère de Laurence
 Geneviève Vauzeilles - Lucie
 Philippe Léotard - Le docteur Sabouret
 Philippe Noiret - Michel Descombes
 Jean-Claude Durand - Philippe
 Catherine Anne Duperray - Josiane Lalande, le professeur chahuté (as Catherine-Anne Duperray)
 Jean Sourbier - André
 André Mortamais - Le client
 Thierry Herbivo - Jean Mancheron
 Nils Tavernier - Patrice

References

External links

1980 films
Films set in Lyon
Films shot in Lyon
1980s French-language films
1980 drama films
Films directed by Bertrand Tavernier
French drama films
1980s French films